Michael James McLeod (born May 4, 1958) is a former safety in the Canadian Football League and the National Football League.

Career
He played at the collegiate level at Montana State University - Bozeman. While in college he was a member of the 1976 National Championship team.  He was also a co-captain of the 1979 Big Sky Conference championship team and was inducted into the Montana State University Athletics Hall of Fame in 2003. 
After graduating, he also played 5 seasons with the Edmonton Eskimos of the Canadian Football League and was a member of 3 Grey Cup Championship teams. He joined the Green Bay Packers in early in the 1984 season after he left the Eskimos, and played 20 games for them in two seasons.
He is currently the owner of McLeod Insurance and Financial Services, Inc. in Bozeman, Montana.

See also
List of Green Bay Packers players

References

External links
Just Sports Stats

1958 births
Living people
American football safeties
Canadian football defensive backs
American players of Canadian football
Montana State Bobcats football players
Green Bay Packers players
Edmonton Elks players
Players of American football from Montana
Sportspeople from Bozeman, Montana